Dutko is a Polish and Ukrainian surname. Notable people with the surname include:

 Bob Dutko (born 1960), conservative Christian talk radio host in Detroit, Michigan
 Dennis Dutko (1943–1990), member of the Michigan House of Representatives from 1974–1989
 John W. Dutko (1916–1944), United States Army soldier
 Taras Dutko (born 1982), Ukrainian Paralympic footballer

See also 
 
 Dutko Worldwide, a Washington, DC-based bipartisan lobbying firm

References 

Polish-language surnames
Ukrainian-language surnames